Xuxa Abracadabra is a 2003 Brazilian fantasy adventure film produced by Diler Trindade and distributed by Warner Bros. Pictures and Globo Filmes. Directed by Moacyr Góes, it stars Xuxa Meneghel, Márcio Garcia, Cláudia Raia, Brunno Abrahão, Maria Mariana Azevedo, Heloísa Périssé, Leandro Hassum, Lúcio Mauro Filho, and Sérgio Mamberti. The film tells the story of a librarian named Sofia who agrees to babysit her friend Matheus's children. While picking up the children at Matheus's great uncle's house, they find a magical book that takes them to the land of fairy tales.

The film was developed as a children's film focusing on fairy tales and folklore, a departure from the teen-focused projects Meneghel usually produced and starred in. The screenplay was written by Flávio de Souza, who added several characters from children's stories into the film.

The film premiered on December 18, 2003, and grossed 11 million reais upon wide release in Brazil. Xuxa Abracadabra received negative reviews from critics, but was considered an improvement in quality compared to other films involving Meneghel.

Plot 
One Saturday night, children's librarian Sofia (Xuxa Meneghel) is getting ready to go out with her best friend (Heloísa Périssé) when she gets a phone call from Matheus (Márcio Garcia), the widower of a cousin she was close to. He asks Sofia to babysit his children, Júlia (Maria Mariana Azevedo) and Lucas (Brunno Abrahão). Sofia agrees, because not only does she adore Matheus's children, she is secretly in love with him.

Sofia meets the children at Matheus's great uncle's house. His great uncle (Sérgio Mamberti) is an astronomer and sorcerer who owns a magical book. Upon opening it, Sophie and the two children fall into it, landing in the Enchanted Forest where all fairy tales happen. While in the Enchanted Forest,  Sofia, Júlia, and Lucas meet fairy tale characters such as Snow White (Talita Castro), her stepmother, the Evil Queen (Cláudia Raia), and her Prince Charming (Cláudio Heinrich). They also meet Saci (Toni Garrido), Little Red Riding Hood (Debby Lagranha), and the Big Bad Wolf (Lucio Mauro Filho), among other fairy tale characters. Because Sofia and the children are from the real world, the fairy tales are disturbed. This empowers the secret villain, who plans to rally the monsters in horror stories to invade the Enchanted Forest, conquer it, and eventually invade the real world.

Sofia saves Júlia and Lucas, but then discovers that the children have to discover the door back to the real world themselves in order to bring Matheus to the Enchanted Forest to save Sofia, the forest itself, the fairy tales, and even the real world.

Cast 

Xuxa Meneghel as Sofia
Márcio Garcia as Mateus
Cláudia Raia as the Evil Queen
Brunno Abrahão as Lucas
Maria Mariana Azevedo as Júlia
Heloísa Périssé as Patrícia
Leandro Hassum as Bluebeard / The Frog Prince
Bruna Marquezine as Maria
Ademir Rocha as João
Talita Castro as Snow White
Cláudio Heinrich as Prince Charming
Debby Lagranha as Little Red Riding Hood
Kayky Brito as Puss in Boots
Lúcio Mauro Filho as Big Bad Wolf
Sérgio Mamberti as Uncle Nicolau (Uncle Nick) / Magical Merlino
Tom Cavalcante as the Storyteller
Eva Todor as the Grandmother
Cristina Pereira as Little Red Riding Hood's mother
Luís Salem as the Magic Mirror
Toni Garrido as Saci
Gustavo Pereira as Pinocchio
Pietro Mário as Pintor
Marcelo Torreão as the Huntsman
Gustavo Ottoni as Pirata Caolho
Nilvan Santos as Pirata
Fabiricio Poilido as Zombie
Gabriel Jacques as Vampire
Robetinho Martinelli as Mummy
Rafael Senna as Frankenstein
Gaspar Filho as Cyclop
Rouge as Themselves

Production
Xuxa had an old desire to produce a film with a children's language. Xuxa e os Duendes was a film directed to the public juvenile-child, but that pleased the minors. The reverse path is occurring: a movie for the children, which will please the larger ones as well. Abracadabra, is a fantasy for children. The idea was to join, in a single script, several characters of children's stories. The hostess, who appears to unite the tales, becomes the true princess, entitled to kiss the Prince Charming. Recounting the inspiration of making the film, Williams said:
Xuxa I always wanted to make a film that combines fairy tale and folklore in a fun way. When Diler Trindade [producer] brought the screenplay of Flávio de Souza, [writer Rá-Tim-Bum Castle], Xuxa approved the idea - It was the reason for TV hots to stop in the sequel to films about elves, which was considered to have a third sequence, and start working on Abracadabra. With Moacyr Góes as director, Góes, was challenged to escape the "caricature" tone that he sees in Brazilian children's productions. Góes says that when he accepted Trindade's invitation to direct the film, he started to study cinema watching productions from all walks of life. "In 2002, I saw about 800 films, from Eisenstein to 'Clueless'." The filmmaker said he had no problem in suffering prejudices because he integrated a film production format of declared commercial ambition. To live the roles of the real "world", that of Sofia, and those of fantastic character, was cast a cast of 39 actors, many known from TV. The recordings began in September 2003 and lasted four weeks. To live the main characters of the film, were called Heloísa Périssé (Patricia), Brunno Abrahão (Lucas), Maria Mariana Azevedo (Júlia), Debby Lagranha (Little Red Riding Hood), Kayky Brito (Puss in Boots) and Leandro Hassum (Bluebeard / The Frog Prince) among others. The character Mateus, interpreted by Marcio Garcia, was the romantic pair of Xuxa, in this production, Xuxa revealed that kissing with the actor in the film was not technical, "There is a technical kiss yes, and I have already tasted the two." The non-technical, for those who are not actress like me is much better. are very similar, the scene becomes more real if you give a real kiss." Luciano Szafir was initially cast to live the character Mateus, however the production felt that people could confuse the story with the last film: Xuxa e os Duendes 2 in which he made pair romantic with Xuxa. Claudia Raia plays Evil Queen, according to the actress "Xuxa called me saying she had a villain role for me. I said my dream was to be Snow White's stepmother". The Rouge group, which makes a special participation. The members of the Rouge group appear in the movie making a show at a nightclub at a particular point in the plot. The singers spent a day in Rio de Janeiro, where the recordings were made.

Release
The premiere of the film occurred on December 12, 2003, at the Parque Mundo Xuxa, in the SP Market Shopping Center, in the South Zone of São Paulo, Xuxa wanted to follow closely the preview of the film. "Father and mother are going to have a good laugh as well. It's a cool program to eat popcorn and to fall behind "- said Xuxa at the press conference.

The presence of TV hots Xuxa Meneghel, caused rampage in the place and left a young woman injured. According to park press secretary Marcelle Canfild, Rita de Cassia Basile, 21, attempted to circumvent the safety of the site in an attempt to approach the hots, when a grid surrounding the fans fell. The girl stumbled and had her leg immobilized amidst the push-shoving of the fans. The young woman suffered a twist in her right knee, was rescued by the local fire department and sent to the Pedreira hospital. "The doctor advised her to put ice on the wound and keep her leg suspended for a few hours," Marcelle said. The premiere in Rio de Janeiro, occurred on December 15, 2003, but this time did not count the presence of Xuxa, only with some actors in the cast of the film. The film was released on December 19, 2003.

As the film's release, Xuxa posed with the cast of the film, on Angra dos Reis Island, for Caras magazine. At the time Xuxa, he injured a small accident during a story he made on Caras Island. She was taking pictures with fans when the deck she was sank into and cut off her right leg. Taken in her private helicopter to the hospital Copa D'Or, the "Queen children" received 11 points in the leg. As a form of disclosure, Xuxa also attended the Domingão do Faustão on December 14, 2003. to talk about the debut of the project.

Home media
The production was recorded and released on VHS and DVD, by Warner Home Video. The material contains Interactive Menu, Choice of Scenes, Music Video, Making Of, Game, Recording Errors, Trailer, Multiangle: Effect Construction, Last Day Clip, Interview with Talking Crowd and Effects Director.

Reception

Critical reception
Like previous Xuxa films, Abracadabra received low acclaim from critics, but were positive compared to the previous ones. Marcelo Forlani of the Omelete site, was critical of the production that he said was "once again hastily done, without the least concern for pre-production. characters, are free of any three-dimensional depth, have as main defect the total absence of coherence". He also criticized the team responsible for the makeup in Abracadabra "writing it is one of the worst seen in the cinema". The beard of the pirate Bluebeard is more false than a note of R$13.50 reais and the monsters wear costumes that seem to have been rented in a And the worst of it, the color of the fake nose used by Claudia Raia when she becomes the Evil Queen is quite different from her skin". concluding that the "film only proves how much the Brazilian people still need to grow culturally". writing for Epipoca, Rubens Ewald Filho considered the film "less execrable than the others, in this, there is even a figure in animation, the talking cricket of "Pinocchio", which has a nice intervention. He also praised the participation of the actors, but considered them poorly used in the film. But it was negative in his review writing that "the film was made in a hurry, with little money and relative commitment, the set design is very bad and there is only one minute of external". The dialogues are extremely bad and bland. won a few more amusing phrases was Claudia Raia, in the role of Snow White Stepmother, which at least has a few moments of brilliance, the rest falls in the common grave. Writing to the Uol Site, the same critic considered Abracadabra, a bit less bad than the previous one. But not much. Nor anything significant. At least we are free from those terrifying makeup (but not from the unfortunate costumes, Xuxa spends most of the time with an unfortunate prom dress that only serves to disrupt her).

Writing for ISTOÉ, Mariane Morisawa praised the quality of the film, writing that "The film is not enough to be Shrek, who plays very cleverly with the fairy tales, but represents a breakthrough for Xuxa. Rather than Xuxa e os Duendes 2". Similarly, a critic of the Estadão, praised the film considered it superior in relation to the previous one, writing that "Xuxa is more beautiful in Abracadabra than in the two Duendes 2, the effects of the film are more taken care of". The audiences surveyed for AdoroCinema gave the film a three-star rating of five with a 2.9-point rating. The audiences surveyed for IMDb, gave a score of 1.8 points to the film. The audiences surveyed for Filmow, gave a score of 1.8 points to the film, based on 2793 votes. Inácio Araujo for Folha, said that contrary to previous productions, Abracadabra tries to separate children from consumers, "A not inconsiderable effort in a film by limited definition, since it consists in trying to distinguish between children and consumers, a distinction that apparently never Xuxa bothered to establish".

Box office
"Xuxa Abracadabra" was potentially considered a popular success by the media, even before it was released. With annual releases, the films of TV hots Xuxa Meneghel remained among the best box office of Brazilian films. After succeeding in launching two films dedicated to his adolescent audience, Xuxa decided to devote himself to producing films for his children's audience, the first release Xuxa e os Duendes, was the only Brazilian film to exceed the 1 million mark viewers in Brazil in 2002, as well as the phenomenon City of God by Fernando Meirelles and Katia Lund (3.2 million). Its sequel Xuxa e os Duendes 2 (2002) reached 2,301,152 box office in 2003, being the fifth Brazilian production most seen in Brazil in 2003. The budget for Xuxa Abracadabra was between R$5 and R$7 million reais, more than R$2 million reais for disclosure. becoming the largest budget of a film of Xuxa. Xuxa Abracadabra was released in 300 rooms in Brazil, premiered as the most viewed on its first weekend, pulling Disney's animation Brother Bear out of the top box office rankings in the country. The film, which debuted with 305 copies distributed throughout Brazil, was watched by 161,527 people. The film 2.193.188 box office, being the last film of Xuxa a is of 2 million of box office. being the fourth most watched national film in Brazil in 2004. The film grossed a gross of 11,677,129.00 reais.

See also 
 List of Brazilian films of the 2000s

References

External links 
 

2000s fantasy adventure films
Warner Bros. films
Brazilian fantasy adventure films
Brazilian children's films
Films based on fairy tales
Fairy tale parody films
Films shot in Rio de Janeiro (city)
2000s Portuguese-language films